RPMsg (Remote Processor Messaging) is a protocol enabling inter-processor communication inside multi-core processors.

Background 
Modern SoCs usually employ heterogeneous processors in Asymmetric multiprocessing (AMP) configurations, each of which may be running a different instance of an Operating system. Typically, SoCs have a central multi-core processor running a high-level OS, such as Linux, in a Symmetric multiprocessing (SMP) configuration, and additional remote processors running various flavors of a Real-time operating system. These remote processors are often used to offload CPU-intensive tasks from the main application processor, or to access hardware blocks otherwise inaccessible by the central processor. Rpmsg facilitates communication between the various processors in the system, by providing means of sending inter-processor messages back and forth.

Implementations 
RPMsg is present in the Linux kernel, has been demonstrated in Zephyr (operating system), FreeRTOS, Cadence XOS, ThreadX, QNX and is also available as a stand-alone component for microcontroller-based systems. Most of the RPMsg implementations are developed as open-source.

History 
RPMsg was developed for the Linux kernel by Ohad Ben-Cohen of Wizery  and was merged to Linux 3.4 on 20 May 2012. It was first used by Google, in Android Ice Cream Sandwich, on the Galaxy Nexus phone, to enable offloading of cpu-intensive multimedia tasks on the OMAP4: from the ARM Cortex-A9 cores, running the Linux Kernel, to the ARM Cortex-M3 cores, running the TI-RTOS OS. Several semiconductor companies have since added support for RPMsg, including Texas Instruments, STMicroelectronics, Xilinx, NXP Semiconductors, Renesas Electronics and Nordic Semiconductor.

References 

Internet protocols